Graham Annable (born June 1, 1970) is a Canadian cartoonist and animator. He is the creator of Grickle, published by Alternative Comics, and one of the founders of the Hickee humor anthology (also published by Alternative Comics). Annable has created works for the television, film, video game, and comic book industries.

Life and career
Annable was born in Sault Ste. Marie, Ontario, Canada. After graduating from Sheridan College in Oakville, Ontario, where he was classically trained as an animator, Annable ended up at LucasArts. He worked there for ten years, starting in 1994 on Full Throttle and ultimately as a lead animator on the cancelled Sam & Max: Freelance Police. In addition, Annable has done illustration and cartoon work for (among others) Chuck Jones, Nickelodeon, and Walt Disney Productions. His self-produced short animated films are also popular among YouTube watchers. Annable was employed as creative director at Telltale Games during their first year, and has continued working closely with them, later designing Puzzle Agent, amongst other titles.

He moved to Portland to work as a story artist on Coraline. He co-directed Laika's 3D stop-motion/CGI animated feature film The Boxtrolls (2014) which was nominated for the Academy Award for Best Animated Feature.

Published work

Grickle (Alternative Comics, 2001)
Further Grickle (Alternative Comics, 2003)
Hickee (contributor) (Alternative Comics, 2003)
Hickee volume 2, #2 (contributor) (Alternative Comics, 2004)
Stickleback 2005 (Alternative Comics, 2005)
Project: Superior (contributor) (AdHouse Books, 2005)
Hickee volume 3, #4 (contributor) (Alternative Comics, 2008)
Flight Volume Five: Evidence (contributor) (Villard Books, 2008)
Nelson Tethers: Puzzle Agent (designer) (Telltale Games, 2010)
The Book of Grickle (Diamond Books, 2010)
Puzzle Agent 2 (designer) (Telltale Games, 2011)
Peter & Ernesto: A Tale of Two Sloths (First Second, 2018)
Peter & Ernesto: The Lost Sloths (First Second, 2019)
Peter & Ernesto: Sloths in the Night (First Second, 2020)

Filmography
 A Goofy Movie (1995) clean up artist: Phoenix Animation Toronto
 Coraline (2009) storyboard artist
 ParaNorman (2012) storyboard artist
 The Boxtrolls (2014) director
 Kubo and the Two Strings (2016) storyboard artist
 Missing Link (2019) additional story artist

Awards

 2002 Harvey Award nominee for Best New Talent.
 2015 Academy Award nominee for The Boxtrolls.

Notes

References
 Comic Shop News, April 2001
 Flight Comics

External links

 
 
 Grickle Channel on YouTube

Alternative cartoonists
Canadian animated film directors
Canadian television directors
Canadian comics artists
Artists from Ontario
Artists from Portland, Oregon
People from Sault Ste. Marie, Ontario
1970 births
Laika (company) people
Living people
Canadian storyboard artists
Sheridan College animation program alumni
Canadian expatriates in the United States